In the fictional universe of the television series The X-Files, an "X-File" is a case that has been deemed unsolvable or given minimal-priority status by the Federal Bureau of Investigation; these files are transferred to the X-Files unit. The files constitute an unassigned project (outside the Bureau mainstream) that is more or less concerned with unexplained phenomena, fringe pseudo-scientific theories, and non-credible evidence of paranormal activity.

History

First X-Files
During season 5, episode 15, "Travelers," the first X-File was initiated in 1946 by J. Edgar Hoover. It contained information about a series of murders that occurred in Northwest America during World War II, seven of which took place in Browning, Montana. Each of the victims was ripped to shreds and consumed, as if by a wild animal. However, many of the victims were found in their homes, as if they had allowed the killer to enter. In 1946, police cornered what they believed to be such an animal in a cabin in Glacier National Park. They shot it, but when they entered the cabin to retrieve the carcass, they found only the body of Richard Watkins. The murders stopped that year. Believing that the case was too bizarre to be solved adequately, Hoover labeled it unsolved and locked it away in the hope that it would eventually be forgotten. However, the murders resumed in 1954 and continued to occur every few years.

In 1952, an X-File regarding something that killed cattle and terrorized the human inhabitants of Point Pleasant, West Virginia was added to the cases. After witnesses described the culprits as primitive-looking men with red piercing eyes, they became known as the moth men. The case detailing this phenomenon was consequently filed under "M" within the X-Files.

In the same year, Dorothy Bahnsen, a clerk working at the FBI Headquarters, was responsible for the files. She had originally filed the cases under U for "unsolved", but had moved them to a more spacious X cabinet when she ran out of room. There, they began to be unofficially known as "X-Files". The director's office still decided which cases were filed under X, but also discouraged people from looking at the ones that had been labeled unsolved. Special Agent Arthur Dales was one of the first agents to try to tackle the cases. He had some success, but the FBI and their superiors wanted several cases to remain unsolved, and Agent Dales eventually retired in obscurity.

1990s
It was not until 1990 that another agent decided to take a look. Special Agent Fox Mulder was generally considered the best analyst in the FBI's Violent Crimes Section. At first, he thought the X-Files seemed like "a garbage dump for UFO sightings, alien abduction reports; the kind of stuff that most people [would] laugh at as being ridiculous". However, Mulder soon became fascinated by the files and read hundreds of those he was allowed access to. He read everything he could about paranormal phenomena and the occult. He eventually transferred to the X-Files Section and worked on some cases with his girlfriend at the time, Diana Fowley. Fowley was an FBI agent with knowledge of and a belief in parapsychology. She stopped working on the cases when her relationship with Mulder ended and she accepted an assignment abroad.

In March 1992, the X-Files were stored in Mulder's office in the basement of the FBI's J. Edgar Hoover Building in Washington, D.C. Mulder's superiors distrusted his methods and, as a result, Section Chief Scott Blevins assigned Agent Dana Scully to work with Mulder on the cases. Blevins claimed to believe that Mulder had developed a consuming devotion to the X-Files and that Scully, who was trained as a medical doctor, would lend proper scientific analysis to the cases. In fact, Scully later learned that she had been assigned to debunk the X-Files project.

Eventually, Scully came to believe in the existence of alien life and in a powerful conspiracy inside the American government that worked to keep the aliens a secret. The proof establishing these facts that Mulder and Scully uncovered and added to the X-Files was overwhelming, and even scientifically undeniable.

During the first season (199394), Mulder and Scully investigate X-file cases. A man they refer to as "Deep Throat" often provides them with classified information to help them on their cases. However, he is killed in the season one finale, "The Erlenmeyer Flask", for helping the agents, and the X-Files are shut down.

In the second season (199495), Mulder is operating as a general assignment agent when he receives an anonymous phone call from a mysterious man who tells him that the X-Files have to be reopened. Once the two later met, the mysterious man claimed that the government conspiracy had killed "Deep Throat", closed down the X-Files and separated the agents assigned to the cases as an initial attempt to secure the truth they were hiding.

In the season two episode "Ascension", Mulder's superior, Assistant Director Walter Skinner, reopens the cases, aware that the X-Files are what the conspiracy fears most. 

A short time later, Mulder offered his badge and the X-Files to Skinner, in return for the whereabouts of a certain member of the government conspiracy.

2000s
In the eighth season (200001), Special Agents John Doggett (played by Robert Patrick) and Monica Reyes (played by Annabeth Gish) are assigned to the X-Files. The X-Files investigations were closed in the 2002 series finale, "The Truth".

2010s

The X-Files Project was reinstated after Skinner contacted Scully, who was working in a private hospital, to get her and Mulder to meet Tad O'Malley, a conspiracy talk show host.

Personnel

Deputy Director 
 Alvin Kersh

Assistant Directors 
 Brad Follmer
 Walter Skinner

Special Agents 
 Dana Scully
 Fox Mulder
 John Doggett
 Monica Reyes
 Diana Fowley
 Jeffrey Spender
 Leyla Harrison
 Kyd Miller
 Liz Einstein
 Arthur Dales
 Alex Krycek (formerly)

References

Fictional elements introduced in 1993
Unit
Fictional government investigations of the paranormal
Federal Bureau of Investigation in fiction